Zor Lagaa Ke... Haiya! is a 2009 Indian children's film starring Meghan Jadhav, Mithun Chakraborty and Mahesh Manjrekar. The film attracted media attention for its environmental message of Save our Trees. Amitabh Bachchan narrated the film.

Plot
A group of children with the help of a beggar try to save some trees from a construction company's intent on cutting them down to make way for new buildings.

Cast

 Meghan Jadhav as Rohan (Protagonist)
 Mithun Chakraborty as Raavan
 Mahesh Manjrekar as Gupta
 Seema Biswas as Ram's mother
 Gulshan Grover as Bakshi
 Sachin Khedekar as Vivek - Karan's father
 Anita Date-Kelkar
 Hardik Thakkar as Laddu
 Riya Sen as Chamki
 Raj Zutshi as Asthana
 Ashwin Chitale as Ram

Music
"Ehsaas Bejaan Hai" – Shaan
"Hari Bhari Duniya"  (Instrumental)
"Hawa Hawa" (Instrumental)
"Koi Aaye Koi Jaye" – Armaan Malik, Nilesh Singh, Tanmay Chaudhary
"Mairi Mairi" – Roop Kumar Rathod
"Pawan" (Instrumental)
"Satrangi Sapno Ki" – Armaan Malik, Tanmay Chaudhary
"Zor Lagaa Ke Haiya" – Kunal Ganjawala, Shweta Pandit
"Zor Lagaa Ke Haiya" (Remix) – Kunal Ganjawala, Shweta Pandit

Reception
Zor Lagaa Ke...Haiya! received positive reviews and won four film festival awards.

References

External links
 

2009 films
2000s Hindi-language films
2000s Urdu-language films